Tabor is a city in Fremont County and extends northward into Mills County in the U.S. state of Iowa. The population was 928 at the time of the 2020 census.

Geography
Tabor is located at  (40.896605, -95.672368).

History 

In 1852 the city of Tabor was founded by "a few families from Oberlin, Ohio, almost all of them Congregationalists," "generous people, early settlers from New England and Ohio who had brought with them Puritan ideas of religion, and Sumner’s and Phillips’ and Garrison’s ideas of freedom." Among them were the Christian clergymen George Gaston, Samuel A. Adams, and Rev. John Todd, and their families. They chose to settle in what is now Tabor in order to found a Christian college, which eventually became Tabor College. The founders were impressed with this high location and mutually selected the name "Tabor" after the Biblical name of Mount Tabor, a mountain near Nazareth, the town of Jesus' childhood.

The town was the home of many abolitionists; Rev. Todd, co-founder of Tabor College, was a "conductor" on the Underground Railroad. The residents of Tabor held monthly abolitionist prayer meetings, and helped runaway slaves whenever they could.

During the Bleeding Kansas period (1854–1860), Tabor was on a route established to enable anti-slavery partisans to reach Kansas without needing to go through the slave state of Missouri. A shipment of 200 Sharps rifles, sent from Boston for use in Kansas by free-state partisans, were stored there (in John Todd's barn). In 1857–1858 abolitionist John Brown spent the winter in Tabor, assembling and training men for his raid on Harpers Ferry.

Tabor College was located in the city from 1853 until 1927, when it closed for financial reasons. The college's buildings housed German Prisoners of War during World War II.

The Tabor & Northern Railway, a 9-mile line connecting with the Wabash Railroad at Malvern, operated from 1889 to 1934. It was operated by the College.

Demographics

2010 census
At the 2010 census, there were 1,040 people, 418 households and 272 families living in the city. The racial makeup was 98.5% White, 0.7% African American, 0.3% Asian, 0.1% from other races, and 0.5% from two or more races. Hispanic or Latino of any race were 2.0% of the population.

There were 418 households, of which 29.9% had children under the age of 18 living with them, 50.2% were married couples living together, 10.0% had a female householder with no husband present, 4.8% had a male householder with no wife present, and 34.9% were non-families. 31.6% of all households were made up of individuals, and 15% had someone living alone who was 65 years of age or older. The average household size was 2.34 and the average family size was 2.95.

The median age was 44.3 years. 23.2% of residents were under the age of 18; 6.2% were between the ages of 18 and 24; 21.3% were from 25 to 44; 27.1% were from 45 to 64; and 22.2% were 65 years of age or older. The gender makeup of the city was 48.3% male and 51.7% female.

2000 census
At the 2000 census, there were 993 people, 387 households and 267 families living in the city. The racial makeup was 99.60% White, 0.10% Asian, and 0.30% from two or more races. 0.81% of the population was Hispanic or Latino of any race.

There were 387 households, of which 30.5% had children under the age of 18 living with them, 55.6% were married couples living together, 11.6% had a female householder with no husband present, and 31.0% were non-families. 28.7% of all households were made up of individuals, and 20.2% had someone living alone who was 65 or older. The average household size was 2.38 and the average family size was 2.91.

24.1% of the population were under the age of 18, 5.2% from 18 to 24, 22.6% from 25 to 44, 23.0% from 45 to 64, and 25.2% who were 65 years of age or older. The median age was 44 years. For every 100 females, there were 84.6 males. For every 100 females age 18 and over, there were 74.1 males.

The median household income was $36,750 and the median family income was $50,000. Males had a median income of $31,042 and females $23,068The per capita income was $16,979. About 3.7% of families and 7.9% of the population were below the poverty line, including 11.5% of those under age 18 and 9.0% of those age 65 or over.

Education
Fremont–Mills Community School District operates public schools.

National Historic Places and attractions
Todd House (1853), home of abolitionist John Todd and Underground Railroad station, now a museum
Hunter School (1901), one room school house
Tabor Antislavery Historic District (1853), series of abolitionist related buildings and places

Cultural references
The town of Gilead, in Marilynne Robinson's Gilead, is a fictionalised version of Tabor.

See also
 Springdale, Iowa

References

External links
 City website
Tabor Historical Society website

Cities in Iowa
Cities in Fremont County, Iowa
Cities in Mills County, Iowa
Populated places on the Underground Railroad
Underground Railroad in Iowa
1852 establishments in Iowa
Populated places established in 1852
John Brown sites